Khoja Tohir (formerly Khushtoirijar) is a village in Sughd Region, northern Tajikistan. It is part of the jamoat Yakhtan in Devashtich District.

References

Populated places in Sughd Region